Thirsty Ear Recordings is an American independent record label.  It was founded in the late 1970s as a marketing company for the then-unnamed alternative music field, and expanded to issue its own records in 1990.

Thirsty Ear came to prominence in the mid-1990s with a series of CD reissues of early industrial albums by artists such as Foetus, Einstürzende Neubauten, Marc Almond, Swans, and Test Dept.  The label also released new albums by alternative rock bands such as Baby Ray, Madder Rose, and The Church. Foetus would remain on the label, recording original music on Thirsty Ear through 2001.

More recently, Thirsty Ear has released jazz albums as part of its Blue Series.  Enlisting Matthew Shipp as the artistic director. The Blue Series has released albums by artists such as Shipp, William Parker, Charlie Hunter and Tim Berne, while also inviting electronica artists DJ Spooky, Meat Beat Manifesto, and Spring Heel Jack, hip-hoppers El-P and Antipop Consortium, and even Slayer drummer Dave Lombardo.

Roster

 Antipop Consortium
 Baby Ray
 Beans
 Tim Berne
 Big Satan
 blink.
 Guillermo E. Brown
 Roy Campbell
 DJ Spooky
 DJ Wally
 Mark Eitzel
 El-P
 Peter Evans
 Free Form Funky Freqs
 The Free Zen Society
 The Gang Font
 Mary Halvorson and Jessica Pavone
 Charlie Hunter and Bobby Previte as Groundtruther
 Albert King
 KTU
 Mike Ladd
 Dave Lombardo
 Mat Maneri
 Meat Beat Manifesto
 Nils Petter Molvaer
 Ben Neill
 William Parker
 Daniel Bernard Roumain
 Carl Hancock Rux
 Scanner with The Post Modern Jazz Quartet
 Sexmob
 Matthew Shipp
 Sigmatropic
 Spring Heel Jack
 Craig Taborn
 Visionfest
 David S. Ware
 Pete M. Wyer
 Vernon Reid and DJ Logic are the Yohimbe Brothers
 Weasel Walter 
 Eri Yamamoto

See also 
 List of record labels

External links
 Official site
 Thirsty Ear Discography at discogs.com

American independent record labels
Industrial record labels
Alternative rock record labels
Jazz record labels